Piseinotecus kima is a species of sea slug, an aeolid nudibranch, a marine gastropod mollusk in the family Piseinotecidae.

Distribution
This nudibranch was described from Oysterbay, Dar es Salaam, Tanzania.

Description
This piseinotecid nudibranch is translucent white in colour and reached 5 mm in length but probably grows larger as the only known animal was not fully mature. The entire body and the lower part of the rhinophores are covered with scattered orange-yellow and smaller white spots. The rhinophores and oral tentacles have white spots near the base, followed by a pale green band, then a broad white band and clear tips. The digestive gland in the cerata is pale brown and there are white and small red-brown spots on the surfaces of the cerata. The cerata are slightly tuberculate as in some species of Eubranchus.

Ecology
Piseinotecus kima feeds on hydroids.

References

Piseinotecidae
Gastropods described in 1970